Cralopa kaputarensis is a species of gastropod in the Charopidae family. It is endemic to Australia.

References

Sources

Gastropods of Australia
Cralopa
Gastropods described in 1990
Taxonomy articles created by Polbot